Bigg Boss is a television reality show broadcast on Colors TV in India. It follows the Big Brother format, which was first developed by Endemol in the Netherlands. Within a span of 16 years of telecast, Bigg Boss has rolled out 16 seasons (latest being season 16, airing on Colors TV), one spin-off version and one OTT version.

Season 2

 Rahul Mahajan made headlines when he broke the rules of the show and escaped over the house by jumping over the wall.

Season 3

 Contestant Kamal Rashid Khan had caused ruckus inside the house which lead to a controversial exit by makers after he threw a bottle at Rohit Verma but later hit Shamita Shetty.

Season 4

 TV actors Sara Khan and Ali Merchant were paid Rs.50 lakhs to get married on the show. The wedding is considered forbidden in Islam, because Sara Khan and Ali Merchant were already married. Ali Merchant's mother, Salma, however, said Muslim law permitted the same couple to remarry as many times as they wished to.
  Pakistani actress Veena Malik was involved in physical relationship with Ashmit Patel.
 During the first week of the show's airing, activists of Shiv Sena, a political party, started protesting against the inclusion of Pakistani housemates in the show. After being evicted from the house, Rahul Bhatt claimed that Bigg Boss is scripted. In November 2010, the Information and Broadcasting Ministry served a notice on Colors, due to complaints of indecent exposure aired on national television, asking the channel to change the timings of the show from 9:00 pm to 11:30 pm. The channel later got a stay order from Bombay High Court allowing them to continue the telecast of the show during prime time.

Season 5

Akashdeep Saigal had a fight with Mahek Chahal in which he threatened to bring out Mahek's personal life and when Salman Khan scolded him for the fight he accused Salman of hitting him and causing him emotional hurt during his time on the show. After the show ended he again accused Salman saying that he destroyed his career.

Season 6

 Contestant Imam Siddiqui made a statement about host Salman Khan that Salman Khan owed him money. He also removed his clothes after a midnight fight with his co-participants.

Season 7

 Armaan Kohli was arrested from the set of the show when a complaint filed by British singer-actress Sofia Hayat for allegedly assaulting her during their stay in the show.
 Kushal Tandon and Tanisha Mukherjee got into a nasty fight during a task after Tanisha pushed Kushal and Kushal body shamed and said nasty stuff to Tanisha. Kushal even climbed on the roof and escaped the house after this incident. In the weekend the host Salman Khan was caught favoring Tanisha instead of Kushal despite her unarguably violent behavior and Khan supported all of Mukherjee's wrongdoings.
Kushal Tandon got physical with VJ Andy after Andy made nasty comments on Gauahar Khan. This caused Bigg Boss to throw Kushal out of the house. Gauahar too had exit the house with Kushal after she accused Bigg Boss for being unfair towards Kushal but later they both were brought back in the house and Gauahar went on to win the season.

Season 8

 Karishma Tanna had a big fight with Gautam Gulati after he abused her during the Hijack task in the second week. This led to the whole house turning against Gautam.
 In November 2014, on Gautam Gulati's birthday, Diandra Soares had taken him into the bathroom which lead to another controversial topic of the house. After Diandra's eviction, there was another controversial topic after reports started saying she was pregnant when she reportedly went to the hospital but later she denied all of the rumours. 
 Ali Quli Mirza was trying to escape from the show by climbing up the rooftop to escape the house when he was slapped by Sonali Raut for passing inappropriate remarks.

Bigg Boss Halla Bol

 The introduction of special panel members on occasional eviction episodes came under controversy during the season. The production team was mainly accused for violating the concept of the original Big Brother franchise and allowing interference from external agents into the house environment. The second week saw appearances from Andy and Kamya who were seen forcing their opinions on the housemates by calling it a guide to their stay. However Kamya, on a relative off-note, went on to malign targeted housemates' stance and reputation by wording her take as the 'viewer's point of view'. Subsequent to the episode's airing critics termed her conduct as 'adding script to a rather spontaneous programme'. A similar incident took place in the fourth week where Sargun Mehta's argument with Minissha received much backlash from viewers. Despite demands and complaints from viewers, the broadcaster declined the opportunity to explain the addition.

Season 9

Kishwer Merchant disgusting act spitting in Rishabh Sinha water and food including Keith. 
 During a task, contestant Rishabh Sinha made Kishwer Merchant walk like a dog for three hours.

Season 10

 Priyanka Jagga, after creating fights in the house and saying nasty things to Lopamudra Raut and Manu Punjabi's late mother got kicked out by host Salman Khan.

 Contestant Swami Om threw his urine on co-contestants Bani J and Rohan Mehra. Later, the makers of the show evicted Swami Om. He has had several exits before on the show but later came back.

 The fight between Bani J and Lopamudra Raut got ugly after the BB Call Centre Task which lead to Bani trying to strangle Lopamudra's neck.

Season 11

 Zubair Khan attempted suicide to get out of the show and was hospitalized for consuming pills after host Salman Khan blasted him for using abusive language against women of the house. He claimed that Salman Khan threatened him that he would not be able to work in the industry anymore after he leaves the house. The host Salman Khan called him 'dog' on the telecast episode. Later Salman Khan sarcastically apologized by saying, "I really need to apologize... I am really sorry to all the dogs of this world".

Season 12

During the captaincy task which named "Breaking News", Deepak Thakur to create news, said demeaning things about Megha Dhade and even passed lewd comments on her character. On listening to all the things about herself, in a fit of anger, she hurled a shoe and even spit on him.

Season 13

Rashami Desai's rumoured boyfriend Arhaan Khan was revealed to have a child on national television. He had kept this a secret from Rashmi and this caused a lot of controversy in their relationship.

Rashami Desai threw tea on Sidharth Shukla during a Weekend Ka Vaar episode when Sidharth was constantly referring to Rashami as "aisi ladki". Salman had seen all the drama live and he bashed both Rashami and Sidharth for their behavior.

Vishal Aditya Singh and Madhurima Tuli had got into a fight on the show. Madhurima was seen hitting Vishal with a frying pan and after this Madhurima was ejected from the show for physical violence. However, unlike prior cases of physical violence in the Bigg Boss house, she was not ejected immediately and was instead ejected on the Weekend Ka Vaar episode.

Season 14 

 Contestant Jaan Kumar Sanu, son of Kumar Sanu, made a remark against Marathi language, against Rahul Vaidya. But the former apologized for his remarks.

 On Day 63, the heated arguments started between Rubina Dilaik and Kavita Kaushik got ugly when Kavita tells to Rubina that she knows her husband's truth. Rubina tells her to speak the truth if she has guts. Kavita threatens to slap her. Both ask each other to shut up and Kaushik walks out of the house.

On Day 72 after heated argument for a week, Vikas Gupta pushed Arshi Khan in swimming pool after she abused his mother. Gupta was ejected from the Bigg Boss house, but later he re-entered the house.

On Day 103, the heated arguments started between Rubina Dilaik and Sonali Phogat got ugly after Sonali Phogat started abusing Rubina and Nikki. Sonali also threatened Rubina and Nikki that after she will come out of the house she will send her men to teach them lessons.

 On Day 123, argument started between Abhinav Shukla and Rakhi Sawant when Rakhi started verbally bullying Abhinav. Abhinav called Rakhi a nasty woman whereas Rakhi called him tharki. After Rakhi became ferocious with Abhinav, Rubina threw a bucket of soapy water on Rakhi for which she was nominated for the next week as punishment.

OTT 

Zeeshan Khan was bashed by host Karan Johar following which he suffered from an anxiety attack inside the house.

On Day 18, Zeeshan Khan was ejected from the House due to physical violence with Pratik Sehajpal. This caused controversy among the viewers and they accused Bigg Boss of partiality as both the housemates were involved in the fight but only one was ejected and the other was kept.

Season 15 

On Day 3, There was heated argument between Jay Bhanushali and Pratik Sehajpal which grew so much that Pratik started damaging the property of the Bigg Boss house. Bigg Boss punished all the Bigg Boss Jungle housemates that they will be nominated throughout the week. As a result, all contestants started shouting and accusing Bigg Boss for being unfair by nominating everyone who were innocent and not nominating Pratik who did everything.
On Day 4, Pratik Sehajpal broke the bathroom lock while Vidhi Pandya was taking a bath. After the other contestants got to know about that, they all started to fight and mostly everyone supported Vidhi while Pratik refused to apologize for his behaviour and claimed that he didn't do anything wrong. 
On Day 18, when Donal Bisht and Vidhi Pandya were evicted by housemates as a part of double and mid-week eviction, fans started to protest that their eviction was unfair.
On Day 20, Afsana Khan during the Entrance Task got into a verbal fight with Akasa Singh, where she also teared off the latter's shirt, kicked her and made fun for the way she dressed.
On Day 40, Afsana Khan tried to injure herself with a knife after being denied the entry to the VIP Zone resulting the crew to take her out of the house.
On Day 74, Abhijit Bichukale after helping Devoleena Bhattacharjee throughout the task asks her for a kiss in exchange. "I can do anything for you", he offers, "but I'd like a kiss in return". Bhattacharjee responds angrily, saying she will never kiss him and warns him not to cross his limits and take advantage of her generosity. Agitated by this, Abhijit threatens to drink Lizol.

Season 16 

On Day 40, Archana Gautam physically struck Shiv Thakare, injuring him. This led to Archana being ejected from the show. She was later recalled during Ravivaar Ka Vaar because she was provoked with a subject out of the house by Thakare.
On Day 47, when Tina Datta tripped and injured her ankle, both Shalin Bhanot and MC Stan started helping her out but it eventually led to an ugly fight where the two started abusing and MC Stan even took a vase and ran towards Shalin to almost hit him with it. It resulted into Stan being nominated for four consecutive weeks.
On Day 80, during the nomination task, Shalin Bhanot and MC Stan got into a heated argument and started abusing each other. MC Stan even threatened to kidnap and assault Bhanot outside the house.
 On Day 87, Archana Gautam got into a fight with Vikkas Manaktala. It started with Vikkas making tea for himself in the kitchen but Archana told him not to and she asked him to keep his tea aside. As Vikkas continued doing his work, Archana pulled the utensil which was being used for making tea and flipped it. This led to hot boiling water getting thrown at  Priyanka Choudhary and Vikkas Manaktala, which led to a huge controversy.
 On Day 87, Shalin Bhanot and Priyanka Choudhary fought with Archana over food. Archana said nasty things to both of them, but when Archana commented about Shalin's ex-wife, that made him angry and it led to him pushing chairs around in the house and was seen damaging the house property. He requested Bigg Boss to call him into the confession room, broke down and urged to remove him from the show stating he can't stay in a house full of dirty people.
 On Day 110, Tina Datta was having a conversation with  Priyanka Choudhary  when she revealed that Shalin Bhanot wanted to meet her before coming to the show to form an alliance, but she denied. He had also taken Sajid Khan's name for this and even met Gautam Vig before entering the Bigg Boss house. Tina continued saying that Shalin even asked her for cheap and materialistic things which she can't even say on camera.

References

Controversies
21st-century controversies
Hindi television content related lists
Television controversies in India